Anna Lee is a British television crime drama series, first broadcast on 10 January 1993, that ran for a total of six episodes on ITV. The series, loosely based on the detective novels of Liza Cody, starred Imogen Stubbs as the title character, alongside Brian Glover, John Rowe, Peter Wight and Wil Johnson. The series was produced by Brian Eastman, in conjunction with Carnival Films for London Weekend Television.

Following a single pilot episode, broadcast in 1993, London Weekend Television commissioned a full-length five-episode series, to be filmed later that year for broadcast in 1994. The pilot had a mostly different cast, apart from Stubbs and Glover. All six episodes were later broadcast in the United States on the A&E cable network. Music for the series was provided by Anne Dudley, while the theme tune, "Sister, Sister", was performed by Luciana, who also appeared in the final episode.

Notably, despite all six episodes being adapted from their parent books, considerable alterations were made for television, much to the dismay of writer Liza Cody. Reportedly, this prompted Cody to abandon writing any further Anna Lee books; as she had previously signed a contract with LWT to allow for any further books to be adapted for television. However, despite much detail being removed for the television adaptations, LWT's most notable contribution to series was the casting of Brian Glover; like his character Selwyn Price, Glover was an ex-professional wrestler, and his room full of wrestling posters seen in the series were in fact real posters featuring Leon Arras, the name Glover used when wrestling.

Cast
 Imogen Stubbs as Anna Lee; a former policewoman now working as a private detective
 Brian Glover as Selwyn Price; an ex-wrestler who lives in Anna's apartment building
 Michael Bryant/John Rowe as Commander Martin Brierly; Anna's boss
 Ken Stott/Peter Wight as Bernie Schiller; a fellow detective
 Wil Johnson as Stevie Johnson; another fellow detective
 Barbara Leigh-Hunt/Sonia Graham as Beryl Doyle; Commander Brierly's secretary
 Ceri Jackson as Ros Russell; a former police colleague, who is still on the force

Episodes

Pilot (1993)

Series (1994)

References

External links

1993 British television series debuts
1994 British television series endings
1990s British crime television series
1990s British drama television series
ITV television dramas
Television series by ITV Studios
London Weekend Television shows
English-language television shows
Television shows set in London
Television shows set in Sussex